Railway dams and reservoirs were used to supply water to an extensive railway system that ventured into low rainfall, and poor water quality areas of the inner regions of Western Australia in the 1890s.

Some of the dams were made redundant with the completion of the Goldfields Water Supply Scheme which provided a more certain supply along the Eastern and Goldfields lines.

Droughts
Seasonal variations and drought conditions in various areas made rainfall and re-filling of dams a reportable event in the West Australian media.

Water quality
Water quality was a perennial problem, and some dams and supplies had levels of unwanted salinity and other ingredients that seriously affected the life-time of the boilers in steam locomotives used by the Western Australian Government Railways (WAGR).

Eastern Railway
In the 1890s the Eastern Railway was designated as being from Fremantle to Kalgoorlie.

Railway dams were located at:

 Midland Junction   
 Chidlows Well         
 Clackline Junction  
 Spencers Brook    
 Burlong Pool         
 Northam

Eastern Goldfields Railway
The Eastern Goldfields railway started east of Northam, following development of other branch lines from Northam.

 Cunderdin (to Public Works Department (Western Australia) in 1903)
 Tammin
 Kellerberrin
 Merredin
 Burracoppin
 Bodallin
 Parkers Pool (1899) (Parkers Road 1900+) 
 Southern Cross Parsonage (Parsonage dropped 1905) 
 Yellowdine No. 1  
 Yellowdine No. 2
 Karalee
 Koorarawalyee	
 Boorabbin No. 1  
 Boorabbin No. 2  
 Boondi
 Woolgangie No. 1
 Woolgangie No. 2  
 Bullabulling No. 1
 Bullabulling No. 2    
 Broad Arrow
 Bardoc
 Goongarrie
 Kanowna (not WAGR 1903)  
 Coolgardie               
 Niagara (not WAGR 1903)  
 Malcolm (1905 +)  
 Laverton (1905 +)

Great Southern Railway
The Great Southern Railway was originally a private land grant railway, and was later taken over by the government.
 
 1890s (Beverley – Albany)
 Later starting points of the Great Southern were at York, Spencers Brook, Avon Yard.
 195 – Mile (Yornan)
 Wagin Lake (Wagin)  
 Tambellup
 Cranbrook     
 Albany

Northern Railways

 Mullewa
 Yalgoo
 Mount Magnet
 Day Dawn (1903 +)  
 Stakewell (1905 +) 
 Nallan (1905 +)

WAGR annual reports
The information about the dams – Return of Reservoirs – can be found in the WAGR annual reports, but there is no consistency as to which appendices they are listed in during the period 1899–1905.

 1899	Appendix G p. 47
 1900 Appendix D p. 57
 1901 Appendix D p. 61
 1903 Appendix F p. 54	

The appendices are fully expanded tables that include the capacity of the dams, as well as their location in miles from the Perth railway station.

See also
 Granite outcrops of Western Australia

Notes

Reservoirs in Western Australia
Dams in Western Australia